Paolo Bernardi is an Italian professor of pathology who has an h-index of 96 and 34,893 citations of his works. He works at University of Padua in Italy.

References

External links
Paolo Bernardi

Italian pathologists
20th-century births
Academic staff of the University of Padua
Living people
Year of birth missing (living people)